Charles 'Sly Fox' DeBarber is an American cyber threat intelligence and computer security professional, best known for his role as a cyber intelligence analyst on the CBS television series Hunted. He is a former United States Army Staff Sergeant and is a Senior Privacy Analyst at the reputation firm Phoenix Advocates, LLC.

Education
DeBarber completed his MA in Intelligence Operations from American Military University in 2011, a BS in Administration & Management from Excelsior College in 2008, an AS in Intelligence Operations from Cochise College in 2008, and graduated from the Defense Language Institute where he studied Modern Standard Arabic.

Career
DeBarber served in the US Army as a 35N (Signals Intelligence Collector/Analyst) from 2004 to 2013. During that time he completed one deployment during the surge of Operation Iraqi Freedom. He was awarded an Army Achievement Medal for his part in the recovery of the remains of an DUSTWUN soldier in 2008. He obtained the rank of staff sergeant (SSG). During his service, he was awarded two Army Achievement Medals, an Army Commendation Medal, Military Outstanding Volunteer Service Medal, Iraqi Campaign Medal, and two Meritorious Unit Commendations.

Since leaving the military, DeBarber has worked as a Certified Ethical Hacker, cyber intelligence analyst, and digital forensics investigator. He joined the cyber security firm Fortalice, LLC as a Program Manager for Intelligence Operations in 2014 and as of 2020 works for the technology firm Eccalon, LCC.

In 2016, he was chosen as a Cyber Analyst and lead Digital Forensics Examiner on CBS's reality television show Hunted. He was featured in the episode "Operation Cupid's Revenge".

Mr. DeBarber testified in the 2019 civil trial against the defunct GirlsDoPorn sex trafficking ring. 

In 2021, DeBarber established a firm for assisting victims in purging non-consensual pornography (NCP) called Phoenix Advocates & Consultants (PAC). He appeared before the Canadian House of Commons on June 7th, 2021 and criticized PornHub's role in failing to impede the spread of NCP for over a decade.

Non-profit work
Since 2015, DeBarber has sat on the advisory board for the anti-child sex trafficking NGO Child Rescue and has assisted similar NGOs in efforts to recover lost children and combat child exploitation.

References

Intelligence analysts
Living people
United States Army non-commissioned officers
Year of birth missing (living people)
United States Army personnel of the Iraq War